Jonathan Willcocks (born 9 January 1953) is an English composer and conductor.

Willcocks was born in Worcester, the son of conductor and composer Sir David Willcocks. He was a chorister at King's College, Cambridge, and an Open Music Scholar at Clifton College. He graduated with an Honours degree in Music from the University of Cambridge in 1974, where he held a choral scholarship at Trinity College. He served as director of music at Portsmouth Grammar School (1975–78) and Bedales School, Petersfield (1978–89).

He is conductor and musical director of Guildford Choral Society and Chichester Singers, and of the professional chamber orchestra Southern Pro Musica. From 1998 to 2008 he was the director of the Junior Academy, Royal Academy of Music in London. In 2016, Willcocks was appointed Festival Conductor of the Leith Hill Musical Festival, the 5th since Ralph Vaughan Williams and succeeding Brian Kay who held the post for 21 years.

References

External links
 
Royal Academy of Music, Junior Academy

English composers
Musicians from Worcester, England
People educated at Clifton College
Honorary Members of the Royal Academy of Music
1953 births
Living people
Choristers of the Choir of King's College, Cambridge